Edgar Jadwin, C.E. (August 7, 1865 – March 2, 1931) was a U.S. Army officer who fought in the Spanish–American War and World War I, before serving as Chief of Engineers from 1926 to 1929.

Early life
Jadwin was born in Honesdale, Pennsylvania on August 7, 1865 as the son of Cornelius Comegys Jadwin, and graduated first in the United States Military Academy class of 1890. He was commissioned in the U.S. Army Corps of Engineers. His classmates included Colden Ruggles, Fred W. Sladen, Frank M. Caldwell, Clint C. Hearn, Daniel W. Ketcham, Herbert Deakyne, Francis Marshall, Harry H. Bandholtz, Henry D. Todd Jr., William C. Davis, George G. Gatley, William S. McNair and William J. Snow. All of these men would, like Jadwin himseld, attain the rank of general officer.

His son, Olympic equestrian Cornelius Comegys Jadwin II, was born in 1896.

Military career
After commissioning, Jadwin served with various engineer units between 1891 and 1895. He then fought during the Spanish–American War.

After serving as district engineer at the expanding ports of Los Angeles and Galveston, he was selected by General Goethals as an assistant in the construction of the Panama Canal, on which he worked from 1907 to 1911. Jadwin served in 1911–1916 in the Office of the Chief of Engineers focusing on bridge and road matters. He was promoted to lieutenant colonel on October 12, 1913.

He was promoted to colonel in the National Army on July 6, 1917, exactly three months after the American entry into World War I. He received a brevet to brigadier general on December 17, 1917. Upon the country's entry into World War I, he recruited the 15th Engineers, a railway construction regiment, and led it to France. He directed American construction and forestry work there for a year and received the Army Distinguished Service Medal, the citation for which reads:

At the conclusion of the war, President Woodrow Wilson appointed Jadwin to investigate conditions in Poland in 1919.  This assignment was followed by an observer assignment in the Ukraine. From 1922 to 1924, Jadwin headed the Corps' Charleston District and Southeast Division. He then served two years as Assistant Chief of Engineers. As Chief of Engineers he sponsored the plan for Mississippi River flood control that was adopted by the United States Congress in May 1928. Jadwin retired as a lieutenant general on August 7, 1929.

Dredge Jadwin
The Vicksburg, Mississippi district of the Army Corps Of Engineers operates a large inland river dredge named after Edgar Jadwin. The dredge Jadwin is used mainly in the deep draft ship crossings of the Lower Mississippi River between Baton Rouge and New Orleans to keep a federally mandated channel depth of no less than 48 feet and width of 500 feet. The Jadwin also operates on the Lower Mississippi River above Baton Rouge to maintain the shallow draft channel of 9 feet deep by 300 feet wide. The dredge is one of 3 Corps owned dredges classified as a "dustpan" dredge, due to the shape of the suction/cutting head which resembles a dustpan.

Dates of rank

Source:

Awards and honors
Jadwin received the Army Distinguished Service Medal, the Companion Order of the Bath from Great Britain, and the Commander in the Legion of Honour from France.

Death and legacy
He died in Gorgas Hospital in the Panama Canal Zone on March 2, 1931, and was buried at Arlington National Cemetery, in Arlington, Virginia.

References

This article contains public domain text from

External links
 

1865 births
1931 deaths
United States Army Corps of Engineers personnel
United States Military Academy alumni
United States Army generals
Burials at Arlington National Cemetery
People from Honesdale, Pennsylvania
Lafayette College alumni
United States Army Corps of Engineers Chiefs of Engineers
United States Army generals of World War I
Recipients of the Distinguished Service Medal (US Army)
Military personnel from Pennsylvania